Montcabrier is a commune in the Tarn department in southern France.

Gallery

See also
Communes of the Tarn department

References

Communes of Tarn (department)